Hangman's Wharf is a 1950 British crime film directed by Cecil H. Williamson and starring John Witty, Genine Graham and Campbell Singer. Its plot concerns a doctor working in Shadwell who is called out for an emergency on a ship docked in the River Thames, where he is framed for murder.

Main cast
 John Witty - Doctor David Galloway 
 Genine Graham - Alison Maxwell 
 Patience Rentoul - Mrs Williams 
 Gerald Nodin - Sir Brian Roderick 
 Campbell Singer - Inspector Prebble 
 Max Brimmell - Krim 
 Patricia Laffan - Rosa Warren

Production
The film was based on a BBC radio serial written by John Beldon. Location shooting was done along the River Thames and at Falmouth and St Mawes.   The railway station at which John Witty - Doctor David Galloway - arrives in Cornwall was St Ives.  The branch is still open, and the area still similar today.

References

Bibliography
 Chibnall, Steve & McFarlane, Brian. The British 'B' Film. Palgrave MacMillan, 2009.

External links

1950 films
British crime films
Films directed by Vernon Sewell
Films based on radio series
Films set in England
1950 crime films
British black-and-white films
1950s English-language films
1950s British films